Richard Lindsey (born June 30, 1956) was an American politician. He was a member of the Alabama House of Representatives from the 39th District, serving between 1983 and 2018. He is a member of the Democratic party.
His home county is Cherokee County.

References

Living people
Democratic Party members of the Alabama House of Representatives
1956 births
21st-century American politicians